The 2014 National Club Baseball Association (NCBA) Division I World Series was played at University of Tampa Baseball Stadium in Tampa, FL from May 23 to May 29.  The fourteenth tournament's champion was Utah State University.  This was Utah State's second title in the last three seasons.

Format
The format is similar to the NCAA College World Series in that eight teams participate in two four-team double elimination brackets.  There are a few differences between the NCAA and the NCBA format.  One of which is that the losers of Games 1–4, 7 and 8 move to the other half of the bracket.  Another difference is that the NCBA plays a winner take all for its national title game while the NCAA has a best-of-3 format to determine its national champion.

Participants

Results

Bracket

* denotes game went to extra innings

Game results

† – Game was originally scheduled for 3:15 PM, but was pushed back due to a rain delay in the previous game.
‡ – Game was originally scheduled for 7:30 PM, but was pushed back due to rain delays in the two earlier games.
# – Game was originally scheduled on May 27 at 7:30 PM, but was postponed to the next morning due to rain.

Championship game

Notes
Utah State became only the second to win multiple NCBA Division I World Series joining Colorado State (2004-06, 2008-10).  Utah State had previously won in 2012.

See also
2014 NCBA Division I Tournament
2014 NCBA Division II World Series
2014 NCBA Division II Tournament

References

2014 in sports in Florida
2014 in baseball
National Club Baseball Association
Sports competitions in Tampa, Florida
Baseball competitions in Florida